Asteropeia densiflora is a species of plant in the Asteropeiaceae family. It is endemic to Madagascar.  Its natural habitat is subtropical or tropical high-altitude shrubland. It is threatened by habitat loss.

References

Endemic flora of Madagascar
densiflora
Near threatened plants
Taxonomy articles created by Polbot
Taxa named by John Gilbert Baker
Flora of the Madagascar subhumid forests